is a private university in Sayama, Saitama, Japan, established in 1999.

The predecessor of the school was founded in 1974. In 1988, it became a junior college specializing in small business administration. In 1999, it was elevated to a four-year college, specializing in management of service industries. In 2007, a department of health care management was added. A nursing school was added in 2009.

External links
 Official website 

Educational institutions established in 1974
Private universities and colleges in Japan
Universities and colleges in Saitama Prefecture
1974 establishments in Japan
Sayama